Karl-Heinz Steffens (born 28 November 1961) is a German clarinetist and conductor.

For the first part of his musical career, Steffens was a solo clarinetist, and also served as principal clarinet with the Bavarian Radio Symphony Orchestra and the Berlin Philharmonic.

From 2009 to 2018, Steffens was music director of the Deutsche Staatsphilharmonie Rheinland-Pfalz in Ludwigshafen.  During his tenure, the orchestra received such honours as the ECHO award for Best Orchestra in 2015 for their recording of works by Bernd Alois Zimmermann.
 
Steffens was music director of the Norwegian National Opera and Ballet from 2016 to 2018.  In 2017, Steffens announced his intention to stand down early from the Den Norske Opera and Ballet post, owing to conflicts with then-incoming artistic director Annilese Miskimmon.  He concluded his tenure with Den Norske Opera and Ballet in 2018.

In February 2019, the Prague State Opera announced the appointment of Steffens as its next music director, effective with the 2019–2020 season.  In October 2019, the Norrköping Symphony Orchestra announced the appointment of Steffens as its next principal conductor and artistic advisor, effective with the 2020–2021 season.

References

External links
 Official website of Karl-Heinz Steffens

 
 
 

1961 births
German clarinetists
German male conductors (music)
Living people
21st-century German conductors (music)
21st-century clarinetists
21st-century German male musicians
Recipients of the Cross of the Order of Merit of the Federal Republic of Germany
Academic staff of the Hochschule für Musik Hanns Eisler Berlin